Mariano Billinghurst (1810–1892) was an Argentine businessman and politician, pioneer in the construction of the national railroads. The locality of Billinghurst in the Great Buenos Aires, and a street (Billinghurst) in Buenos Aires City takes its name in his honor.

Biography 

He was born in Buenos Aires, son of Robert Billinghurst, an immigrant born in Surrey (England), and Maria Francisca Agrelo Moreyra, born in the city. His father had served as gunner during the Siege of Montevideo.

He had to go into exile for political reasons in Montevideo, Uruguay, where he lived between 1840 and 1850. During this decade he began his career as an entrepreneur, being owner of a cloth factory in Buenos Aires. Later he served as auctioneer at the first property sales house of the city.

As a railway entrepreneur, he installed the horse-drawn tram lines, connecting Plaza de la Victoria to Flores and Plaza de la Victoria to Belgrano. He also built the railway line that linked Buenos Aires with the city of Rosario.

Family
Mariano was the great-grandfather of noted aviator Susana Ferrari Billinghurst. Susana in turn was the grandmother of actress Luciana Pedraza, the wife of actor Robert Duvall.

References 
 

1810 births
1892 deaths
Businesspeople from Buenos Aires
Politicians from Buenos Aires
People from Buenos Aires Province
Argentine people of English descent
Argentine people of Galician descent
Río de la Plata